KVON (1440 kHz) is a commercial AM radio station broadcasting a Spanish AC radio format. Licensed to Napa, California, it serves the Napa County/Sonoma County region of Northern California.  The station is owned by Wilfred Alexander Marcencia and Julissa Marcencia, through licensee Wine Down Media LLC. 

By day, KVON's transmitter broadcasts a 5,000-watt signal.  At night, to avoid interfering with other stations on 1440 AM, the station reduces transmitter power to 1,000 watts.  The station uses a directional antenna pattern at all times utilizing a 4-tower array during daytime and 3-tower array during nighttime operations.  The station's transmitter and antenna array are located at a site south of the Napa, California, adjacent to the Napa River.  The station also simulcasts on the FM band on 96.9 MHz with 12 watts from an antenna that is co-located on a site it shares with KVYN near Yountville, California.

History
On November 17, 1947, KVON first signed on. Originally it broadcast with 500 watts of power around the clock, before getting a power increase. The station was owned by Thomas L. Young from 1971 to 1996.  During Young's ownership, he founded sister station KVYN which went on the air in 1975.

In May 2017 an announcement was made that the station along with KVYN had been sold by Wine Country Broadcasting to Wine Down Media for $425,000.  The transaction was consummated on August 1, 2017.

On December 14, 2021, KVON announced that it would flip to Spanish language programming on January 3, 2022, and some previous programming elements would move to sister station KVYN.  The station is currently the only station in Napa County broadcasting in Spanish 24 hours a day, 7 days a week.  The format is Spanish AC, branded as "Mega Mix 1440/96.9. The switchover to the new format is a culmination of a 5 year transition, bourne out of several events starting with the October 2017 Northern California wildfires, followed by the 2019 California power shutoffs and the COVID-19 pandemic.  Over one third of Napa County's population is Latino and during the these events, Spanish speaking residents had a difficult time retrieving and understanding coverage and implications of these events at the local level. The station's ownership was granted a license to broadcast by the FCC on December 8, 2021.

Previous logo

References

External links
FCC History Cards for KVON

Napa County, California
VON (AM)
Radio stations established in 1947
1947 establishments in California
VON
Variety radio stations in the United States